The following is a list of characters in the anime series Brain Powerd directed by Yoshiyuki Tomino.

Yuu Isami

Yuu Isami is a young teenage boy and the male lead character of the story "A former Reclaimer". After a fateful encounter with Hime Utsumiya, Yuu decides to leave Orphan, escaping with a Brain Powered. Despite the frictions between his family's ambitions to discover more of Orphan's nature and his own freedom, Yuu understands the value of keeping life precious and the memories that he would cherish in his life. He has lone wolf tendencies, often going off on his own for unofficial missions or just sitting on the deck staring at the sky without the company of others.

Hime Utsumiya

Hime Utsumiya is a young teenage girl and the female lead character of the story. She comes into contact with an organic plate which later witnessed its revival into an Antibody, a Brain Powerd, and became its pilot. Supposedly she was chosen to become Orphan's force of hope in giving understanding to its intention to move freely, which in the end she gave the Orphan the meaning of life after trying to rescue Quincy, like a lone seed growing to become a garden of beauty.

Jonathan Glenn

Jonathan Glenn is a Reclaimer at Orphan. Disgruntled at the way Yu was favored from his parents, he became very bitter towards him and wants to compete who is the strongest Antibody pilot. And even his resentment towards his real mother, Capt. Anoa McCormick since he was abandoned since childhood, but was replaced by his undying loyalty to Baron Maximillian. He is aggressive and powerful. Commonly competing with Quincy Issa for control of the Reclaimers. Jonathan also fiercely competes with Yuu, going so far as to taunt him during one of their battles about having made love to his sister (Quincy Issa) and having a tryst with his mother (Midori Isami). He is always eager to fight and desires to beat both Yu and Quincy. He is afraid of living and fighting independently, and eventually learns to care for his mother.

Quincy Issa
 

Real Name: Iiko Isami.
Quincy Issa is a young teenage girl and Yū's elder sister. She is the pilot of red Quincy Grand. A brash leader of the Reclaimers, she disregards any human emotion and resents Yu for being favored by the Antibodies of Orphan. She became confused about Yu's conviction to let Orphan be released from any guilt that her Gran Cher rebelled against her confused state and even Orphan favored her to become the "Girl of Orphan", the chosen embodiment of Orphan's will. In the end, she was rescued by Yu who gave her the understanding of what the Orphan wanted to do.

Kanan Gimms

Kanan Gimms is a young, talented former Grand Cher pilot. She was Yū's best friend and had been raised on Orphan. She leaves Orphan and joins Novis Noah. She is the pilot of Kanan Brain, the other twin Brain Powerd created from the single Antibody B-Plate. Although she has deep feelings for Yu, she maintains her spirited energy but she has reluctance in leaving her home in Orphan to discover new things in Novis-Noa.

Anoa McCormick

Anoa McCormick is the captain of state-of-the-art warship Novis Noah. Her strong exterior hides her dark secret, her longing to be close with her son Jonathan Glenn. But to her own frustrations, she was always ostracized by her son. She nearly gets lost in a Chakra wave, then reappearing as a dark character named Baron Maximillian.

Russ Lundberg

Russ Lundberg is a Brain Powerd pilot aboard the Novis-Noa. He is one of the first Brain Powerd pilots, along with Nanga and Hime. He is a slim, blonde-haired man with an interest in Kanan Gimms. He has leukaemia and has lived as long as he has without treatment due to his interaction with the Brain Powerds.

Nanga Silverly

Nanga Silverly is another Brain Powerd pilot who is with Lasse and Hime in their quest to search for other B-Plates. He is the official squad leader of the Brain Powerd and one of the most muscular men on board.

Higgins Saz

Higgins Saz is the pilot of a yellow Brain Child, Higgins Brain the other twin Brain Powered created from a single Antibody B-Plate. Higgins has a rose tattoo that reacts warmly every time Orphan reacts to a positive emotion. Higgins is almost always in a yellow jump suit. It is noted that she and Captain Laite are romantically involved.

Kant Kestner

Kant Kestner is a genius kid who became a scientist at age 12. He soon befriends one of Nakki's Brain Powerds and becomes its pilot later in the series. Kant is a gifted artist with a love of plants and is able to base most of his papers and theories on photosynthesis. Due to his young age and intellect, he had a hard childhood without friends. Even though he is curious about organic energy, he has no desire to go to Orphan to learn.

Irene Carrier

Irene Carrier is the medical doctor, acupuncturist and, in later series, new captain of Novis Noah after Capt. McCormick's disappearance. While she is a doctor, she was also a top officer in the military. She is looked up to by Hime since she has motherly tendencies in keeping everyone in Novis-Noa safe.

Nakki Guys

Nakki Guys is the pilot of surprisingly four Antibodies, three Brain Powerds and one Grand Cher. Brash and Impulsive, Nakki has the tendency to outlook other Brain pilots and has affections for Hime. But because of his impulsiveness he always get into trouble during battle. He might be trying to be the best Antibody pilot among his peers, but realizes that he is still inexperienced in other matters than just being who he was.

Comodo Mahama

Comodo Mahama is a reconnaissance fighter pilot who wishes to have her own Brain Powerd since she was jealous at her colleagues in the Novis Noa. A devotee to her god Ogoun, she always pray for strength in her battles and ask for a sign if she will be with Nanga.

Winston Geybridge

Winston Geybridge is the current UN secretary general who is also the supreme leader of the Reclaimer faction. He was romantically linked with Naoko Isami in the past until now, but his intentions in keeping Orphan is to maintain the balance of Earth's environment. He was ousted by Baron Maximillian and arrested with Naoko until the release of Quincy from her state as the girl of Orphan.

Naoko Isami

Naoko Isami is the matriarch of the Isami household and Yu's caring and loving grandmother. Even though she resents her son and daughter-in-law's research on using their children as initial "vessels" for the Antibodies, she was able to give her own wisdom to Yu. She is the long lost lover of Winston Geybridge and until now she still is close to him.

Shiela Glass

Shiela Glass is another Reclaimer Grand Cher pilot, quite amazonic and has zealousness in following the ideals of the Reclaimers. The reason is that she has a sibling who died during the Grand Cher wars, but in the end she realized that she was following the wrong idealism after her encounter with Higgins Saz. Shiela is very physically strong, being able to lift Higgins clear off the ground with only one hand. She is in support of Jonathan Glenn over the Isami family that rules Orphan.

Edgar Brancan

Edgar Brancan is a reclaimer at Orphan, and the pilot of the Black Edgar Grand Cher. He has high ambitions to outbeat Jonathan Glenn and become the new leader of Orphan.

Baron Maximillian

Baron Maximillian is the pilot of a powerful and evolved Antibody, the Baronz Grand Cher. At first he was just a mentor for Jonathan that temporarily he gave his Baronz Grand Cher to him, which in the end he/she was actually Anoa McCormick, the missing captain of Novis Noa. Baron Maximillian takes control of Orphan all in the name of Jonathan.

Nelly Kim

Nelly Kim is a lone Brain Powerd pilot whom Yu met when he and his Brain was damaged by the Baron Grand Cher. She gave Yu pieces of wisdom on how to listen and understand carefully of how his Brain feels. But in the end on the second attack made by the Baron Grand Cher she fell and disappeared in a storm gust as the two damaged Brains fused in a Chakra wave and became a hybrid Brain Powerd named Nelly Brain.

K.D. Dean

K.D. Dean is Orphan's undercover spy working at Novis Noah. K.D. is also a Grand Cher pilot but gets shot down while fleeing the ship. He like, most others touched by orphen, is ambitious and willing to kill anyone in his way. He survives and stays on Novis Noa.

Yukio

Yukio is one of the three children whom Hime took care in the first episode. Although responsive in protecting their "big sister" Hime, Yukio is very affectionate in keeping his relationship with the inhabitants in the Novis-Noa while hoping in everything that has happened in the Earth.

Kumazo

Kumazo is of the three children living in the Novis Noah. Although he was involved in some unfortunate events (like being in the hands of a Brain Powerd or Grand Cher), he was able to listen and understand how the Brains are affected on the changes of Orphan.

Akari

Akari is the only girl among the three children in the Novis Noa. She looks up at Hime as like a mother-like parent. Always helping out in some manual chores inside Novis-Noa while getting jealous with Yu's closeness to Hime most of the time.

Captain Laite

Captain Laite is the captain of Novis Noah's Private submarine and Higgens’ lover. He is a tall bald man who has little role in series other than recon.

Kensaku Isami

Kensaku Isami is Yu and Quincy's father, a researcher in the Antibody project, and later as the head scientist inside Orphan. He was more interested in his research than the welfare of his own children, being used as guinea pigs in researching on the Antibodies in response to human emotions. In the end, he realizes that he puts a lot of effort in the research only to find out what Orphan wants to do after Quincy Issa became the Girl of Orphan.

Midori Isami

Midori Isami is Kensaku's wife and assistant. She has little love for her husband, in which while he is focusing on his work she has some "safe fun" with Jonathan Glen whom she fancies more. She merely marries him to progress research into organic energy and to gain a solid power base to become the leader of Orphan. She is a cold and calculating woman who is more than willing to use her own children as mere tools for her goals.

Girl from Orphan

The Girl from Orphan is a human entity which serves as the new will of Orphan's. Originally it was Hime who could channel into Orphan's life stream and revealed to her the beautiful memories with her mother before the war, which proves she is a suitable candidate. But after the few last episodes it was Quincy Issa, after her Gran Cher evolved and accidentally taken by Orphan because of her confused and instable personality. But in the end after both Yu and Hime convinces Orphan to just leave the planet, Quincy was freed from her state while leaving wisdom that life should move on, where it can leave seeds of life for the next generations to enjoy.

Lists of anime and manga characters